Events from the year 2002 in Pakistan.

Incumbents

Federal government
President: Pervez Musharraf 
Prime Minister: Zafarullah Khan Jamali (starting 21 November)
Chief Justice: 
 until 6 January: Irshad Hasan Khan
 6 January-31 January: Bashir Jehangiri
 starting 1 February: Sheikh Riaz Ahmad

Governors
Governor of Balochistan – Amir-ul-Mulk Mengal
Governor of Khyber Pakhtunkhwa – Iftikhar Hussain Shah 
Governor of Punjab – Khalid Maqbool 
Governor of Sindh – Muhammad Mian Soomro (until 26 December); Ishrat-ul-Ibad Khan (starting 26 December)

Events

January
1 January – an earthquake strikes northern Pakistan.
12 January – President Musharraf declares a war on extremism.
18 January – President Musharraf, in an interview with CNN, says he believes that Osama bin Laden is dead.

March
 India shuns Pakistan's offer of talks.

June
22 June – A wedding feast in Pakistan's tribal areas ends in tragedy after an error during the celebratory firing of a mortar shell; fourteen people are killed.

October
 10 October - General elections were held to elect the National Assembly of Pakistan and the provincial assemblies.

November
 21 November - A 6.3  earthquake strikes northern Pakistan, leaving sixteen dead, forty injured, and more than 1,000 buildings damaged.
 26 November - The Pakistan army has to use helicopters to evacuate thousands of people following the earthquake, as roads are blocked and the temperature is falling due to the onset of winter.

Deaths

August 
 5 August - Bashir Niaz, film screenwriter

See also
2001 in Pakistan
2003 in Pakistan
Other events of 2002
Timeline of Pakistani history

References

 
Pakistan
Years of the 21st century in Pakistan
2000s in Pakistan